Tomás Godoy Cruz (May 6, 1791 – May 15, 1852) was an Argentine statesman and businessman. He was a representative to the Congress of Tucumán which on July 9, 1816 declared the Independence of Argentina.

Godoy Cruz was born in Mendoza. He studied in Mendoza, then in Chile at the Royal University of San Felipe, graduating in philosophy, canonical and civil law. He lived in Chile until 1814, and served in the Santiago Cabildo (council) during the last year of his stay. He then returned to Mendoza, setting up a gunpowder factory. He agitated to make General José de San Martín governor of Cuyo, and helped finance the Army of the Andes.

In 1815, at just 24 years old, Godoy Cruz was elected by Mendoza to the Tucumán Congress and served in 1816 for the declaration. He was president on two occasions and vice-president on one.
He subsequently served as governor of Mendoza Province 1820–22. In 1831 he was exiled to Chile where he was a teacher and pioneered silkworm cultivation. He was also a successful merchant of woven goods.

The city of Godoy Cruz and its surrounding department in Mendoza, and streets across the country were named in his honour.

References
 Profile by the Mendoza Province education portal

1791 births
1852 deaths
People from Mendoza, Argentina
Argentine people of Spanish descent
University of Chile alumni
Members of the Congress of Tucumán
Governors of Mendoza Province
People of the Argentine War of Independence
Argentine businesspeople